Volleyball events were contested at the 1965 Summer Universiade in Budapest, Hungary.

References
 Universiade volleyball medalists on HickokSports

U
1965 Summer Universiade
Volleyball at the Summer Universiade